Plus may refer to:

Mathematics
 Addition
 +, the mathematical sign

Music
 + (Ed Sheeran album), (pronounced "plus"), 2011
 Plus (Cannonball Adderley Quintet album), 1961
 Plus (Matt Nathanson EP), 2003
 Plus (Martin Garrix EP), 2018
 Plus (band), a Japanese pop boy band
 Plus (Autechre album), 2020

Companies
 Plus Communication Sh.A, a cellphone company in Albania
 Plus (telecommunications Poland), a mobile phone brand
 Plus (British TV channel), run by Granada Sky Broadcasting
 Plus (Slovak TV channel)
 Plus (interbank network), Visa's ATM and debit card network
 PLUS Markets, a small stock exchange in London, UK
 PLUS Expressway Berhad, concessionaire of the North-South Expressway, Malaysia
 PLUS (Dutch supermarket)
 Plus (German supermarket)
 Plus (autonomous trucking)
 Plus Development, a defunct American computer storage manufacturer

Other
 , the international call prefix
 PLUS Loan, a United States Federal student loan
 Plus Magazine, an online mathematics magazine
 Promoting Logical Unified Security, a system for rating a building's security
 Plus (programming language)
 Professional Liability Underwriting Society, a non-profit organization
 Plus (cereal), a breakfast cereal range by Australian breakfast company Uncle Tobys
 Plus (novel), 1976, by Joseph McElroy
 PLUS card, an expansion card type for some Tandy 1000 computer models
 PLUS, abbreviation of the Freedom, Unity and Solidarity Party of Romania

See also
 
 
 + (disambiguation)
 Minus (disambiguation)
 Plus-size (disambiguation)
 Circled plus (disambiguation) (⊕)